The Whitman–Cobb House is a historic residence in New Market, Alabama.  It was built circa 1861 in a Greek Revival style with Federal and Adamesque details.  The two-story house is rectangular with an ell off the rear on one side.  Originally, a porch separated the house from a detached kitchen, but it was torn down and replaced around 1955 with a one-story addition containing three rooms and a garage.  The three-bay façade has a one-story pedimented porch, which replaced a two-story porch in the 1940s.  The main entrance is double doors flanked by sidelights and topped with a transom.  Windows on the façade are nine-over-nine sashes flanked by narrow two-over-two sashes.  The house has three chimneys on the gable ends; the northwest chimney is inside the clapboard siding.

The house was listed on the National Register of Historic Places in 1982.

References

National Register of Historic Places in Madison County, Alabama
Houses on the National Register of Historic Places in Alabama
Federal architecture in Alabama
Greek Revival houses in Alabama
Houses completed in 1861
Houses in Madison County, Alabama
1861 establishments in Alabama